Josephine Dorothy Butler (January 24, 1920 ― March 29, 1997) was an American activist. She co-founded and was chairman of the D.C. Statehood Party.

Early life 
Butler was born in Brandywine, Maryland, on January 24, 1920, as one of nine children of African-American tobacco sharecroppers Joseph and Helen Arabelle Jenifer. Butler and other students attended school in shanties in the woods until it became possible to attend the newly-constructed Frederick Douglass High School in Upper Marlboro, Maryland. Some local whites violently opposed black education, stoning school buses and threatening parents. Butler recalled, "They saw that if we got more education we would go to the city and get better jobs and then white farm owners would have no one to work in their fields." As a result of Butler's school attendance, her father lost work, forcing her mother to work in Washington, D.C., as a live-in domestic servant. She then attended Strayer University.

Activism and career 
In 1934, at the age of 14, Butler moved to Washington, DC, lying about her age to secure work as a laundress. Butler's husband was a hob carrier. Both began organizing laborers in their respective industries, and Butler organized the first union of black women laundry workers.  Late in the 1930s, Butler heard Paul Robeson and Henry A. Wallace speak. Butler described it as "like an awakening of something that was dormant."

In the 1940s, Butler worked in government cafeterias and organized cafeteria workers. Butler then became a clerk in the United States Veterans Administration. However, the VA summarily dismissed Butler in 1949 in a "loyalty" purge. Butler separated from her husband and moved to Bethesda, Maryland. Butler later discovered she was blacklisted from further government employment.

Butler spent several years in the late 1950s and early 1960s incapacitated with tuberculosis of the kidney. Following her recovery, Butler volunteered with the District of Columbia Lung Association, which later hired her to design educational programs for school children. In 1967, Butler organized her co-workers and formed Local 2 of the Office and Professional Employees International Union, making her workplace the first unionized lung association. She retired around 1980.

Butler became an active volunteer with the local Democratic Party, serving as chair of District 15. However, she was disenchanted with the police violence at the 1968 Democratic National Convention in Chicago and decided "there was something better I could be doing with my time politically". That was the D. C. Statehood Party, which Butler co-founded in 1971. Butler ran for the DC City Council as a party candidate in 1974 and 1976.

Butler was co-chair of Friends of Meridian Hill, a group dedicated to rehabilitating Meridian Hill Park in northwest DC. In 1994 she introduced President Bill Clinton at an Earth Day speech in the park. Clinton later awarded Butler the National Partnership-Leadership Award. The next year she organized an Earth Day parade of 4,000 people to the United States Capitol, where she addressed a crowd of 250,000.

Personal 
Butler married Jack Brown. They divorced, and she took up the last name Butler.

Death 
Butler died at Medlink Hospital in Washington, D.C., on March 29, 1997.

Legacy 
Josephine Butler Parks Center was named in honor of her life and legacy.

References 

1920 births
1997 deaths
People from Brandywine, Maryland
Office and Professional Employees International Union leaders
Trade unionists from Maryland
D.C. Statehood Green Party politicians
Activists from Washington, D.C.
African-American trade unionists